Adda-tee-gala is a village in Alluri Sitharama Raju district in the state of Andhra Pradesh in India.

Geography
It has an average elevation of 183 meters (603 feet).

Demographics
As of Census 2011, Addateegala has population of 6002 of which 3021 were males while 2981 were females, sex ratio is 987. Population of child (age 0-6) was 494 which makes up 8.23% of total population of village. Literacy rate of the village was 84.26%.

Important Persons
Dhana Lakshmi , MLA, Rampachodavaram Constituency..,
Gode Chiranjeevi Rao( Gode Babu Rao) who built First Rice mill, Seetapalli Center  in Addateegala   on 1982...,
Pavanagiri Swamiji Tanuku Venkata Ramayya, Pavanagiri Swamiji..,
Anantha udaya Bhaskar M.L.C  , East Godavari Dst..,
Vanthala Rajeswari , Ex. MLA, Rampa chodavaram.

References 

Villages in Addateegala mandal